Cyclorhiza is a genus of flowering plants belonging to the family Apiaceae.

Its native range is Tibet to Southern China.

Species:

Cyclorhiza peucedanifolia 
Cyclorhiza waltonii

References

Apioideae